The 2020 America East men's soccer tournament was the 32nd edition of the tournament. The tournament decided the America East Conference champion and guaranteed representative into the 2020 NCAA Division I men's soccer tournament.

Background 
The 2020 America East Men's Soccer Tournament was originally to be played in November 2020.  However, the America East Conference postponed all fall sports with the hope to play them in the spring.

Format 
The American East Tournament was contested by the three pod winners plus one wild card.

Qualified teams

Bracket

Matches

Semifinals

Final

References 

America East Conference Men's Soccer Tournament
America East Men's Soccer